Qarahlar or Qarehlar or Qarah Lar may refer to various places in Iran:
 Qarahlar, Ardabil
 Qarehlar, East Azerbaijan
 Shahrak-e Qarah Lar, North Khorasan Province
 Qarehlar, West Azerbaijan
 Qarahlar-e Aqa Taqi, West Azerbaijan Province
 Qarahlar-e Gurkhaneh, West Azerbaijan Province
 Qarahlar-e Hajj Taqi, West Azerbaijan Province